Phạm Hồng Nam (born 7 April 1996) is a Vietnamese badminton player, specializing in doubles play. He was the champion at the 2016 Vietnam International Series in the men's doubles with his partner Đỗ Tuấn Đức.

Career 
He and his partner Đỗ Tuấn Đức competed at the 2021 Southeast Asian Games and won a bronze medal after a semifinal battle against Leo Rolly Carnando and Daniel Marthin of Indonesia.

Achievements

Southeast Asian Games 
Men's doubles

BWF International Challenge/Series (1 title, 2 runners-up) 
Men's doubles

  BWF International Challenge tournament
  BWF International Series tournament
  BWF Future Series tournament

References

External links 
 

1996 births
Living people
Sportspeople from Hanoi
Vietnamese male badminton players
Competitors at the 2015 Southeast Asian Games
Competitors at the 2017 Southeast Asian Games
Competitors at the 2019 Southeast Asian Games
Southeast Asian Games bronze medalists for Vietnam
Southeast Asian Games medalists in badminton
21st-century Vietnamese people